In mathematics, the graph of a function  is the set of ordered pairs , where  In the common case where  and  are real numbers, these pairs are Cartesian coordinates of points in two-dimensional space and thus form a subset of this plane. 

In the case of functions of two variables, that is functions whose domain consists of pairs  the graph usually refers to the set of ordered triples  where  instead of the pairs  as in the definition above. This set is a subset of three-dimensional space; for a continuous real-valued function of two real variables, it is a surface.

In science, engineering, technology, finance, and other areas, graphs are tools used for many purposes. In the simplest case one variable is plotted as a function of another, typically using rectangular axes; see Plot (graphics) for details.

A graph of a function is a special case of a relation. 
In the modern foundations of mathematics, and, typically, in set theory, a function is actually equal to its graph. However, it is often useful to see functions as mappings, which consist not only of the relation between input and output, but also which set is the domain, and which set is the codomain. For example, to say that a function is onto (surjective) or not the codomain should be taken into account. The graph of a function on its own doesn't determine the codomain. It is common to use both terms function and graph of a function since even if considered the same object, they indicate viewing it from a different perspective.

Definition 

Given a mapping  in other words a function  together with its domain  and codomain  the graph of the mapping is the set 

In the abstract definition of a function,  is actually equal to 

Examples

Functions of one variable 

The graph of the function  defined by

is the subset of the set 

From the graph, the domain  is recovered as the set of first component of each pair in the graph .
The codomain , however, cannot be determined from the graph alone.

The graph of the cubic polynomial on the real line

is

If this set is plotted on a Cartesian plane, the result is a curve (see figure).

Functions of two variables 

The graph of the trigonometric function

is

If this set is plotted on a three dimensional Cartesian coordinate system, the result is a surface (see figure).

Oftentimes it is helpful to show with the graph, the gradient of the function and several level curves. The level curves can be mapped on the function surface or can be projected on the bottom plane.  The second figure shows such a drawing of the graph of the function:

See also 

 Asymptote
 Chart
 Concave function
 Convex function
 Contour plot
 Critical point
 Derivative
 Epigraph
 Normal to a graph
 Slope
 Stationary point
 Tetraview
 Vertical translation
 y-intercept

References

External links 

 Weisstein, Eric W. "Function Graph." From MathWorld—A Wolfram Web Resource.

Charts
Functions and mappings
Numerical function drawing